Ridemakerz (alternatively written "RIDEMAKERZ") is an American retailer of customizable toy cars. The business was started in 2007 by Larry Andreini, Chip Foose (of TLC Overhaulin'), and Maxine Clark (of Build-A-Bear Workshop).

History 
The first location opened June 1, 2007 in Myrtle Beach, SC at Broadway at the Beach. Since then, twelve locations had opened in ten other states. In late 2009, Ridemakerz began closing most of its stores. By early 2022, Ridemakerz has opened a total of 5 stores, Myrtle Beach SC, Branson MO, Pigeon Forge TN, Mall of America MN, and Anaheim CA.
The company holds licenses to make the Chevrolet Corvette, Dodge Challenger, Dodge Ram, Dodge Viper, Ford F-250 Super Chief, Ford Mustang, and the Scion xB.

Company information
Ridemakerz is a limited liability company. It was founded in 2007 in St. Louis, Missouri and moved to Rancho Santa Margarita, California in 2009. There are currently 8 locations. The main financier is investor Norman Pozez. Build-A-Bear owns about 25% of the company. In 2010, it opened a warehouse and distribution center in Valencia, California (using the same system as Build-A-Bear) and moving its headquarters to Irvine, California. There are approximately 250 employees nationwide and 16 employees at its headquarters. In 2018, 2 new stores were opened.

References 

Retail companies of the United States
Toy companies of the United States
Retail companies established in 2007
Companies based in St. Louis
American companies established in 2007